Im Spannungsfeld is an East German film. It was released in 1970.

References

External links
 

1970 films
East German films
1970s German-language films
1970s German films